João Pedro Mussica (born 5 April 1991), commonly known as Jeitoso, is a Mozambican professional footballer who plays for Ferroviário de Maputo and the Mozambique national team. He primarily plays as a left-sided centre-back.

Club career
Jeitoso began his youth career at Ferroviário de Maputo, going on to make his professional debut for the Mozambican champions in 2013, winning back-to-back league titles in his first years.

In June 2017, he was signed by South African Premier Division club Cape Town City in preparation for their 2017–18 South African Premier League campaign. The reigning South African Cup champions will add Jeitoso to their back-line alongside fellow Mozambican and former teammate Edmilson who was signed by Cape Town City during the 2016–17 season. He returned to Mozambique in January 2018.

International career
Jeitoso plays as a centre-back and captain for the Mozambican national team.

Career statistics

Club

International

International goals
Scores and results list Mozambique's goal tally first.

Honours

Club
Ferroviário de Maputo
Moçambola: 2015

International
Mozambique
 COSAFA Cup: 2015 runners-up

References

External links

 
 
 
 
 Ferroviário de Maputo profile

1991 births
Living people
Sportspeople from Maputo
Mozambican footballers
Mozambique international footballers
Association football defenders
Clube Ferroviário de Maputo footballers
Cape Town City F.C. (2016) players
Moçambola players
Mozambican expatriate footballers
Mozambican expatriate sportspeople in South Africa
Expatriate soccer players in South Africa